Gregory E. Pence (born January 17, 1948) is an American philosopher.

Biography
He graduated cum laude with a B.A. from William and Mary and a Ph.D. from New York University, writing under visiting Australian bioethicist Peter Singer. Professor Pence taught a required course in bioethics for thirty-four years to 165 medical students at the University of Alabama School of Medicine. In 2006, Samford University awarded him a Pellegrino Medal for achievement in medical ethics. In 2011, he switched from teaching in the medical school to chairing the UAB Department of Philosophy, which he did from 2012 to 2018, after which he continued to be a professor in the department. In 1995, he began to direct, and continues to direct now, UAB's EMSAP (Early Medical School Acceptance Program).

His well-known work defending human cloning has labeled him as a rebel in the scientific community.  Some critics, especially GreenPeace of Europe, consider him an apologist for the safety of GM foods. As displayed in his many books on human cloning (Who's Afraid of Cloning, etc.), he is one of the few bioethicists who believes  that human cloning should not be banned but rather accepted in modern society as a future tool for creating wanted children. In 2001, Pence testified before the US Congress against a bill that would have criminalized all aspects of human cloning. His  many books, and over 70 op-ed essays, explain his views about assisted reproduction, human cloning, and various topics in bioethics.

In 2015, he was invited to write for "American National Biography" the official biography of agricultural pioneer Norman Borlaug, a strong defender of genetically modified food.

His textbook, Medical Ethics, one of the field's standards, was 28 years old in 2018 in its 8th edition and will be in its 9th edition in 2020. At UAB, he won major teaching awards, including the Ingall's and President's. He coached the UAB team that in 2010 won the national championship of the Intercollegiate Ethics Bowl., and UAB teams that won the national championship of the Bioethics Bowl in 2011 at Duke University, in 2015 at Florida State University. and in 2019 at the University of South Alabama.

His 2002 and 2020 tradebooks Designer Food and Overcoming Addiction were named Outstanding Academic Books by CHOICE magazine. In 2019, his university awarded him its Ireland Award for Scholarly Distinction.

Publications

Books
Pence has authored the following books:
 
 
 
 
 
 
 
 
 
 
 
 
 
 
 
 
 
 
He has co-authored one book with G. Lynn Stephens:
 
He has edited four books, the first one below being a collection of his op-eds in newspapers and magazines:
 
 
 
 

Representative Op-Ed Essays:

See also
 American philosophy
 List of American philosophers
 Human Cloning
 Norman Borlaug
 Bioethics

References

External links
 Faculty bio
 GregoryPence: Bioethicist, Author, Speaker
 Humancloning.org

1948 births
Living people
Bioethicists
American philosophers
College of William & Mary alumni
New York University alumni
University of Alabama at Birmingham faculty